Florentina Olar-Spânu (born 6 August 1985), née Spânu, is a Romanian footballer who plays as a forward for Danish Elitedivisionen club Fortuna Hjørring and the Romania women's national team.

Career
Spânu has been a member of the Romanian national team from the beginning of her career, having made her debut in September 2001, in a tie 2003 FIFA World Cup qualifier against Croatia. She played for Clujana, which dominated the Romanian First League throughout the decade, until 2009 when she moved abroad. Following a short stint in the Italian Serie A with Lazio, she signed for Apollon Limassol. In 2013 she accompanied compatriot Laura Rus in signing for Fortuna Hjørring in Denmark's Elitedivisionen, with which she has reached the UEFA Champions League quarterfinals.

Personal life
Spânu is married and has a son with her husband.

Career statistics

1 Romania won 2–0 with both goals scored by Spânu, but the result was overruled by UEFA for fielding an ineligible player.

Honours

Club
 Romanian First League (7): 2002–03, 2003–04, 2004–05, 2005–06, 2006–07, 2007–08, 2008–09
 Romanian Cup (4): 2003–04, 2004–05, 2005–06, 2007–08
 Cypriot First Division (4): 2009–10, 2010–11, 2011–12, 2012–13
 Cypriot Cup (4): 2009–10, 2010–11, 2011–12, 2012–13
 Elitedivisionen (2): 2013–14, 2015–16
 Danish Cup (1): 2015–16

Individual
 Romanian Footballer of the Year: 2015

References

1985 births
Living people
Women's association football forwards
Romanian women's footballers
Sportspeople from Constanța
Romania women's international footballers
Serie A (women's football) players
S.S. Lazio Women 2015 players
Apollon Ladies F.C. players
Fortuna Hjørring players
FC Nordsjælland (women) players
Romanian expatriate footballers
Romanian expatriate sportspeople in Italy
Expatriate women's footballers in Italy
Romanian expatriate sportspeople in Cyprus
Expatriate women's footballers in Cyprus
Romanian expatriate sportspeople in Denmark
Expatriate women's footballers in Denmark
CFF Clujana players
FIFA Century Club